Athleta (Athleta) epigona is a species of sea snail, a marine gastropod mollusk in the family Volutidae, the volutes.

Description

Distribution
This species occurs in the Indian Ocean off Tanzania and Zanzibar.

References

 Bail, P & Poppe, G. T. 2001. A conchological iconography: a taxonomic introduction of the recent Volutidae. Hackenheim-Conchbook, 30 pp, 5 pl. (updated October 2008 for WoRMS)

Volutidae
Gastropods described in 1904